A supermoon is a full moon or a new moon that nearly coincides with perigee—the closest that the Moon comes to the Earth in its elliptic orbit—resulting in a slightly larger-than-usual apparent size of the lunar disk as viewed from Earth. The technical name is a perigee syzygy (of the Earth–Moon–Sun system) or a full (or new) Moon around perigee. Because the term supermoon is astrological in origin, it has no precise astronomical definition.

The real association of the Moon with both oceanic and crustal tides has led to claims that the supermoon phenomenon may be associated with increased risk of events like earthquakes and volcanic eruptions, but no such link has been found.

The opposite phenomenon, an apogee syzygy or a full (or new) Moon around apogee, has been called a micromoon.

Definitions
The term supermoon is attributed to astrologer Richard Nolle while reading "Strategic Role Of Perigean spring tides in Nautical History and Coastal flooding" published in 1976 by NOAA Hydrologist Fergus Wood.  In practice, there is no official or even consistent definition of how near perigee the full Moon must occur to receive the supermoon label, and new moons rarely receive a supermoon label.

Nolle 
Nolle described the concept in a 1979 edition of Dell Horoscope including both full and new moons, but has never outlined why he chose 90% nor has provided a definitive formula for determining if a given full or new moon is "super".  The basic 1979 definition read: 
Nolle amended his definition in 2000 specifying the distance of a given full or new moon be judged against 90% of the mean distance of perigees.  Nolle (incorrectly) referenced  

In 2011, Nolle added apogees to consideration explaining that he based calculations on 90% of the difference in lunar apsis extremes for the solar year. Nolle based those the mean apsis extremes referencing (incorrectly) the Wikipedia article on the subject arriving at: 

Nolle also added the concept of extreme supermoon in 2000 describing the concept as any new or full moons that are at "100% or greater of the mean perigee".

Espenak 
The term perigee-syzygy or perigee full/new moon is preferred in the scientific community. Perigee is the point at which the Moon is closest in its orbit to the Earth, and syzygy is when the Earth, the Moon and the Sun are aligned, which happens at every full or new moon.  Astrophysicist Fred Espenak uses Nolle's definition but preferring the label of full Moon at perigee on full moons occurring "within 90% of its closest approach to Earth in a given orbit" over Nolle's calculations based on the closest of all orbits during the solar year. Wood used the definition of a full or new moon occurring within 24 hours of perigee and also used the label perigee-syzygy.

Other definitions 

EarthSky uses Nolle's definition comparing their calculations to tables published by Nolle in 2000.

Wood also coined the less used term proxigee where perigee and the full or new moon are separated by 10 hours or less.

Occurrence
Of the possible 12 or 13 full (or new) moons each year, usually three or four may be classified as supermoons, as commonly defined.

The most recent full supermoon occurred on August 12, 2022, and the next one will be on July 3, 2023.

The supermoon of November 14, 2016, was the closest full occurrence since January 26, 1948, and will not be surpassed until November 25, 2034. 

The closest full supermoon of the 21st century will occur on December 6, 2052.

The oscillating nature of the distance to the full or new moon is due to the difference between the synodic and anomalistic months. The period of this oscillation is about 14 synodic months, which is close to 15 anomalistic months.  So every 14 lunations there is a Full Moon nearest to perigee.

Occasionally, a supermoon coincides with a total lunar eclipse. The most recent occurrence of this by any definition was in May 2022, and the next occurrence will be in October 2032.

Appearance

A full moon at perigee appears roughly 14% larger in diameter than at apogee. Many observers insist that the moon looks bigger to them. This is likely due to observations shortly after sunset when the moon is near the horizon and the moon illusion is at its most apparent.

While the moon's surface luminance remains the same, because it is closer to the earth the illuminance is about 30% brighter than at its farthest point, or apogee. This is due to the inverse square law of light which changes the amount of light received on earth in inverse proportion to the distance from the moon. A supermoon directly overhead could provide up to 0.36 lux.

Effects on Earth 
Claims that supermoons can cause natural disasters, and the claim of Nolle that supermoons cause "geophysical stress", have been refuted by scientists.

Despite lack of scientific evidence, there has been media speculation that natural disasters, such as the 2011 Tōhoku earthquake and tsunami and the 2004 Indian Ocean earthquake and tsunami, are causally linked with the 1–2-week period surrounding a supermoon. A large, 7.5 magnitude earthquake centred 15 km north-east of Culverden, New Zealand at 00:03 NZDT on November 14, 2016, also coincided with a supermoon.
Tehran earthquake on May 8, 2020, also coincided with a supermoon.

Scientists have confirmed that the combined effect of the Sun and Moon on the Earth's oceans, the tide, is greatest when the Moon is either new or full. and that during lunar perigee, the tidal force is somewhat stronger, resulting in perigean spring tides.  However, even at its most powerful, this force is still relatively weak, causing tidal differences of inches at most.

Total lunar eclipses 
Total lunar eclipses which fall on supermoon and micromoon days are relatively rare. In the 21st century, there are 87 total lunar eclipses, of which 28 are supermoons and 6 are micromoons. Almost all total lunar eclipses in Lunar Saros 129 are micromoon eclipses. An example of a supermoon lunar eclipse is the September 2015 lunar eclipse.

Annular solar eclipses 
Annular solar eclipses occur when the Moon's apparent diameter is smaller than the Sun's. Almost all annular solar eclipses between 1880 and 2060 in Solar Saros 144 and almost all annular solar eclipses between 1940 and 2120 in Solar Saros 128 are micromoon annular solar eclipses.

See also
 Apsis
 Moon illusion
 Syzygy (astronomy)

Notes

References

External links

 Lunar Apogee/Perigee Calculator 
 Richard Nolle's definition
 Richard Nolle's list of supermoons in the 21st century
 Full Moon at Perigee (Super Moon): 2001 to 2100 (Fred Espenak)
 Super Blue Blood Moon 2018  | Check123 1 Minute Video

Astrology
Astronomical events
Lunar science
Moon
Articles containing video clips